Like in Love! is the debut album by the American vocalist Nancy Wilson, it was released in April 1960 by Capitol Records, and arranged by Billy May.

Track listing
 "On the Street Where You Live" (Alan Jay Lerner, Frederick Loewe) - 1:42 	
 "Night Mist" (Ahmad Jamal) - 2:34
 "You Leave Me Breathless" (Ralph Freed, Frederick Hollander) - 2:27
 "The More I See You" (Mack Gordon, Harry Warren) - 2:11
 "I Want to Be Loved" (Johnny Green, Edward Heyman, Billy Rose) - 2:19
 "Almost Like Being in Love" (Lerner, Loewe) - 1:46
 "People Will Say We're in Love" (Oscar Hammerstein II, Richard Rodgers) - 1:57
 "Passion Flower" (Billy Strayhorn) - 2:23
 "Sometimes I'm Happy" (Irving Caesar, Vincent Youmans) - 1:46
 "Fly Me to the Moon" (Bart Howard) - 2:52
 "All of You" (Cole Porter) - 1:49
 "If It's the Last Thing I Do" (Sammy Cahn, Saul Chaplin) - 2:07

Personnel

Performance
From The Music of Billy May: A Discography (Greenwood Press, 1998).
Nancy Wilson – vocals
Willie Smith –alto saxophone
Benny Carter – alto saxophone (1–2, 4–6, 8–9, 11–12)
Jules Jacob – saxophone (3–5, 7, 10–12)
Charles Gentry – saxophone (3–5, 7, 10–12)
William Ulyate – saxophone (1–2, 4–6, 8–9, 11–12)
Jerome Kasper – saxophone (1–2, 6, 8–9)
Fred Falensby – saxophone (1–2, 6, 8–9)
Milt Bernhart – trombone (1–2, 4–6, 8–9, 11–12)
Tommy Pederson - trombone (3, 7, 10)
Milt Raskin – piano
Jack Marshall – guitar (1–3, 6–10)
Bob Gibbons – guitar (4–5, 11–12)
Myer Rubin – double bass (1–2, 4–6, 8–9, 11–12)
Joe Mondragon – double bass (3, 7, 10)
Irving Cottler – drums (1–3, 6–10)
Stan Levey – drums (4–5, 11–12)
Emil Richards – drums (3, 7, 10)
Billy May – arranger, conductor

References

Nancy Wilson (jazz singer) albums
Albums conducted by Billy May
Albums arranged by Billy May
Albums produced by Dave Cavanaugh
Capitol Records albums
1960 debut albums
Albums recorded at Capitol Studios